Thegornis is an extinct genus of Falconidae that lived during the Miocene of South America. The genus was erected by Florentino Ameghino in 1895. Its skull and postcranial morphology are similar to the laughing falcon and forest falcon and also closely related. The seriema Noriegavis holotype was transferred to this genus and the well-preserved specimen described in 2015 attributed to Noriegavis has been classified into Miocariama.

References

Falconidae
Neogene birds of South America
Prehistoric bird genera
Neogene Argentina